Venous thrombosis is blockage of a vein caused by a thrombus (blood clot). A common form of venous thrombosis is deep vein thrombosis (DVT), when a blood clot forms in the deep veins. If a thrombus breaks off (embolizes) and flows to the lungs to lodge there, it becomes a pulmonary embolism (PE), a blood clot in the lungs. The conditions of DVT only, DVT with PE, and PE only, are all captured by the term venous thromboembolism (VTE).

The initial treatment for VTE is typically either low-molecular-weight heparin (LMWH) or unfractionated heparin, or increasingly with direct acting oral anticoagulants (DOAC). Those initially treated with heparins can be switched to other anticoagulants (warfarin, DOACs), although pregnant women and some people with cancer receive ongoing heparin treatment. Superficial venous thrombosis or phlebitis affects the superficial veins of the upper or lower extremity and only require anticoagulation in specific situations, and may be treated with anti-inflammatory pain relief only.

There are other less common forms of venous thrombosis, some of which can also lead to pulmonary embolism. Venous thromboembolism and superficial vein thrombosis account for about 90% of venous thrombosis. Other rarer forms include retinal vein thrombosis, mesenteric vein thrombosis (affecting veins draining blood from the gastrointestinal organs), cerebral venous sinus thrombosis, renal vein thrombosis, and ovarian vein thrombosis.

Classification

Common forms
Superficial venous thromboses cause discomfort but generally not serious consequences, as do the deep vein thromboses (DVTs) that form in the deep veins of the legs or in the pelvic veins. Nevertheless, they can progress to the deep veins through the perforator veins  or, they can be responsible for a lung embolism mainly if the head of the clot is poorly attached to the vein wall and is situated near the sapheno-femoral junction.

When a blood clot breaks loose and travels in the blood, this is called a thromboembolism. The abbreviation DVT/PE refers to a VTE where a deep vein thrombosis (DVT) has moved to the lungs (PE or pulmonary embolism).

Since the veins return blood to the heart, if a piece of a blood clot formed in a vein breaks off it can be transported to the right side of the heart, and from there into the lungs. A piece of thrombus that is transported in this way is an embolus: the process of forming a thrombus that becomes embolic is called a thromboembolism. An embolism that lodges in the lungs is a pulmonary embolism (PE). A pulmonary embolism is a very serious condition that can be fatal depending on the dimensions of the embolus.

Rare forms
While venous thrombosis of the legs is the most common form, venous thrombosis may occur in other veins. These may have particular specific risk factors:
 Cerebral venous sinus thrombosis, cavernous sinus thrombosis and jugular vein thrombosis: thrombosis of the veins of the brain and head
 Central retinal vein occlusion and branch retinal vein occlusion: despite the name these conditions have much more in common with arterial thrombosis and are not treated with anticoagulants
 Paget–Schroetter disease: thrombosis of the veins of the arms (axillary and subclavian veins)
 Budd-Chiari syndrome (thrombosis of the hepatic vein)
 Thrombosis of the hepatic portal system, also known as splanchnic venous thrombosis:
 Thrombosis of the superior mesenteric vein, which may cause mesenteric ischemia (insufficient blood flow to the intestine)
 Portal vein thrombosis
 Thrombosis of the splenic vein
 Renal vein thrombosis (thrombosis of the veins of the kidneys)
 Ovarian vein thrombosis

Parodoxical embolism
Systemic embolism of venous origin can occur in patients with an atrial or ventricular septal defect, or an arteriovenous connection in the lung, through which an embolus may pass into the arterial system. Such an event is termed a paradoxical embolism. When this affects the blood vessels of the brain it can cause stroke.

Causes
Venous thrombi are caused mainly by a combination of venous stasis and hypercoagulability—but to a lesser extent endothelial damage and activation. The three factors of stasis, hypercoagulability, and alterations in the blood vessel wall represent Virchow's triad, and changes to the vessel wall are the least understood. Various risk factors increase the likelihood of any one individual developing a thrombosis:

Risk factors

Acquired

 Older age
 Major surgery, orthopedic surgery, neurosurgery
 Cancers, most particularly pancreatic, but not cancers of the lip, oral cavity, and pharynx
 Immobilization, as in orthopedic casts, the sitting position, and travel, particularly by air
 Pregnancy and the postpartum period
 Antiphospholipid syndrome (such as lupus anticoagulant)
 Trauma and minor leg injury
 Previous VTE
 Oral contraceptives
 Hormonal replacement therapy, esp. oral
 Central venous catheters
 Inflammatory diseases/some autoimmune diseases
 Nephrotic syndrome
 Obesity
 Infection
 HIV
 Myeloproliferative neoplasms including essential thrombocytosis and polycythemia vera
 Chemotherapy
 Heart failure

Inherited

 Antithrombin deficiency
 Protein C deficiency
 Protein S deficiency (type I)
 Factor V Leiden
 Prothrombin G20210A
 Dysfibrinogenemia
 Non O-blood type

Mixed

 Low free protein S
 Activated protein C resistance
 High factor VIII levels
 Hyperhomocysteinemia
 High fibrinogen levels
 High factor IX levels
 High factor XI levels

The overall absolute risk of venous thrombosis per 100,000 woman years in current use of combined oral contraceptives is approximately 60, compared to 30 in non-users. The risk of thromboembolism varies with different types of birth control pills; Compared with combined oral contraceptives containing levonorgestrel (LNG), and with the same dose of estrogen and duration of use, the rate ratio of deep vein thrombosis for combined oral contraceptives with norethisterone is 0.98, with norgestimate 1.19, with desogestrel (DSG) 1.82, with gestodene 1.86, with drospirenone (DRSP) 1.64, and with cyproterone acetate 1.88. Venous thromboembolism occurs in 100–200 per 100,000 pregnant women every year.

Regarding family history, age has substantial effect modification. For people with two or more affected siblings, the highest incidence rates is found among those ≥70 years of age (390 per 100,000 in men and 370 per 100,000 in women), whereas the highest incidence ratios compared to those without affected siblings occurred at much younger ages (ratio of 4.3 among men 20 to 29 years of age and 5.5 among women 10 to 19 years of age).

Pathophysiology

In contrast to the understanding for how arterial thromboses occur, as with heart attacks, venous thrombosis formation is not well understood. With arterial thrombosis, blood vessel wall damage is required for thrombosis formation, as it initiates coagulation, but the majority of venous thrombi form without any injured epithelium.

Red blood cells and fibrin are the main components of venous thrombi, and the thrombi appear to attach to the blood vessel wall endothelium, normally a non-thrombogenic surface, with fibrin. Platelets in venous thrombi attach to downstream fibrin, while in arterial thrombi, they compose the core. As a whole, platelets constitute less of venous thrombi when compared to arterial ones. The process is thought to be initiated by tissue factor-affected thrombin production, which leads to fibrin deposition.

The valves of veins are a recognized site of VT initiation. Due to the blood flow pattern, the base of the valve sinus is particularly deprived of oxygen (hypoxic). Stasis exacerbates hypoxia, and this state is linked to the activation of white blood cells (leukocytes) and the endothelium. Specifically, the two pathways of hypoxia-inducible factor-1 (HIF-1) and early growth response 1 (EGR-1) are activated by hypoxia, and they contribute to monocyte and endothelial activation. Hypoxia also causes reactive oxygen species (ROS) production that can activate HIF-1, EGR-1, and nuclear factor-κB (NF-κB), which regulates HIF-1 transcription.

HIF-1 and EGR-1 pathways lead to monocyte association with endothelial proteins, such as P-selectin, prompting monocytes to release tissue factor-filled microvesicles, which presumably initiate fibrin deposition (via thrombin) after binding the endothelial surface.

Diagnosis

Prevention

Numerous medications have been shown to reduce the risk of a person having a VTE, however careful decision making is required in order to decide if a person's risk of having a VTE outweighs the risks associated with most thromboprophylaxis treatment approaches (medications to prevent venous thrombosis).  It is recommended that people should be assessed at their hospital discharge for persistent high-risk of venous thrombosis and that people who adopt a heart-healthy lifestyle might lower their risk of venous thrombosis. Clinical policy from the American College of Physicians states a lack of support for any performance measures that incentivize physicians to apply universal prophylaxis without regard to the risks.

Surgery 
Evidence supports the use of heparin in people following surgery who have a high risk of thrombosis to reduce the risk of DVTs; however, the effect on PEs or overall mortality is not known. In hospitalized non-surgical patients, mortality does not appear to change. It does not appear, however, to decrease the rate of symptomatic DVTs. Using both heparin and compression stockings appears better than either one alone in reducing the rate of DVT.

Non-surgical medical conditions 
In hospitalized people who have had a stroke and not had surgery, mechanical measures (compression stockings) resulted in skin damage and no clinical improvement. Data on the effectiveness of compression stockings among hospitalized non-surgical patients without stroke is scarce.

The American College of Physicians (ACP) gave three strong recommendations with moderate quality evidence on VTE prevention in non-surgical patients:
 that hospitalized patients be assessed for their risk of thromboembolism and bleeding before prophylaxis (prevention);
 that heparin or a related drug is used if potential benefits are thought to outweigh potential harms;
 and that graduated compression stockings not be used.
In adults who have had their lower leg casted, braced, or otherwise immobilized for more than a week, LMWH may decrease the risk and severity of deep vein thrombosis, but does not have any effect on the incidence of pulmonary embolism.

Prior VTE 
Following the completion of warfarin in those with prior VTE, the use of long-term aspirin has been show to be beneficial.

Cancer 
People who have cancer have a higher risk of VTE and may respond differently to anticoagulant preventative treatments and prevention measures. The American Society of Hematology strongly suggests that people undergoing chemotherapy for cancer who are at low risk of a VTE avoid medications to prevent thrombosis (thromboprophylaxis). For people undergoing chemotherapy for cancer that do not require a hospital stay (those undergoing ambulatory care), there is low certainty evidence to suggest that treatment with direct factor Xa inhibitors may help prevent symptomatic VTEs, however this treatment approach may also lead to an increase in the risk of a major bleed compared to a placebo medication. There is stronger evidence to suggest that LMWH helps prevent symptomatic VTE, however this treatment approach also comes with a higher risk of a major bleed compared to a placebo medication or no treatments to prevent VTE.

For people who are having surgery for cancer, it is recommended that they receive anticoagulation therapy (preferably LMWH) in order to prevent a VTE. LMWH is recommended for at least 7–10 days following cancer surgery, and for one month following surgery for people who have a high risk of VTEs.

Treatment

American evidence-based clinical guidelines were published in 2016 for the treatment of VTE. In the UK, guidelines by the National Institute for Health and Care Excellence (NICE) were published in 2012, updated in 2020. These guidelines do not cover rare forms of thrombosis, for which an individualized approach is often needed. Central and branch retinal vein occlusion does not benefit from anticoagulation in the way that other venous thromboses do.

Anticoagulation
If diagnostic testing cannot be performed swiftly, many are commenced on empirical treatment. Traditionally this was heparin, but several of the DOACs are licensed for treatment without initial heparin use.

If heparin is used for initial treatment of VTE, fixed doses with low-molecular-weight heparin (LMWH) may be more effective than adjusted doses of unfractionated heparin (UFH) in reducing blood clots. No differences in mortality, prevention of major bleeding, or preventing VTEs from recurring were observed between LMWH and UFH. No differences have been detected in the route of administration of UFH (subcutaneous or intravenous). LMWH is usually administered by a subcutaneous injection, and a person's blood clotting factors do not have to be monitored as closely as with UFH.

Once the diagnosis is confirmed, a decision needs to be made about the nature of the ongoing treatment and its duration. USA recommendations for those without cancer include anticoagulation (medication that prevents further blood clots from forming) with the DOACs dabigatran, rivaroxaban, apixaban, or edoxaban rather than warfarin or low molecular weight heparin (LMWH).

For those with cancer, LMWH is recommended, although DOACs appear safe in the majority of situations. For long-term treatment in people with cancer, LMWH is probably more effective at reducing VTEs when compared to vitamin K antagonists. People with cancer have a higher risk of experiencing reoccurring VTE episodes ("recurrent VTE"), even while taking preventative anticoagulation medication. These people should be given therapeutic doses of LMWH medication, either by switching from another anticoagulant or by taking a higher dose of LMWH.

In pregnancy, warfarin and DOACs are not considered suitable and LMWH is recommended.

For those with a small pulmonary embolism and few risk factors, no anticoagulation is needed. Anticoagulation is, however, recommended in those who do have risk factors.

Thrombolysis 
Thrombolysis is the administration of medication (a recombinant enzyme) that activates plasmin, the body's main enzyme that breaks down blood clots. This carries a risk of bleeding and is therefore reserved for those who have a form of thrombosis that may cause major complications. In pulmonary embolism, this applies in situations where heart function is compromised due to lack of blood flow through the lungs ("massive" or "high risk" pulmonary embolism), leading to low blood pressure. Deep vein thrombosis may require thrombolysis if there is a significant risk of post-thrombotic syndrome. Thrombolysis may be administered by intravenous catheter directly into the clot ("catheter-directed thrombolysis"); this requires a lower dose of the medication and may carry a lower bleeding risk but evidence for its benefit is limited.

Inferior vena cava filters
Inferior vena cava filters (IVCFs) are not recommended in those who are on anticoagulants. IVCFs may be used in clinical situations where a person has a high risk of experiencing a pulmonary embolism, but cannot be on anticoagulants due to a high risk of bleeding, or they have active bleeding. Retrievable IVCFs are recommended if IVCFs must be used, and a plan should be created to remove the filter when it is no longer needed.

Superficial venous thrombosis
While topical treatments for superficial venous thrombosis are widely used, the evidence is strongest for the heparin-like drug fondaparinux (a factor Xa inhibitor), which reduces extension and recurrence of superficial venous thrombosis as well as progression to symptomatic embolism.

Prognosis
After an episode of unprovoked VTE, the risk of further episodes after completing treatment remains elevated, although this risk diminishes over time. Over ten years, 41% of men and 29% of women can expect to experience a further episode. For each episode, the risk of death is 4%.

See also
 Portal vein thrombosis
 Arterial thrombosis

References

External links 

 Postgraduate Medicine Journal: A Clinical Review of Venous Thromboembolism

Hematology